The rose-collared piha (Lipaugus streptophorus) is a species of bird in the family Cotingidae. It is found in humid forests growing in the tepui highlands in south-eastern Venezuela, western Guyana and far northern Brazil. Only the male has the rosy collar for which this species is named. The female resembles the screaming piha, but has a cinnamon vent.

Description
The adult male rose-collared piha has the upper parts dark grey and the underparts slightly paler grey, especially on the belly. Round the neck is a conspicuous broad magenta collar and there is a similar patch of colour round the vent. The female is similar to the male but lacks the magenta collar, and the area around the vent is rusty-brown. The male is unlikely to be confused with any other species, but the female could be confused with the female screaming piha (Lipaugus vociferans), but that species is a uniform grey and lacks the rufous area round the vent. The call is also very different, the rose-collared piha male occasionally emitting a loud, sharp "skreeéyr".

Distribution and habitat
The rose-collared piha has a small range in humid forests in Guyana, Venezuela and Brazil. It is usually seen in the middle and upper storeys of the forest, sometimes at the fringes of the woodland, in clearings and in open areas with more widely separated trees. It may be seen singly or in pairs. It feeds mainly on fruit, especially that of Melastomataceae, plucked while in flight.

Status
Lipaugus streptophorus  has a rather restricted range but it is fairly common within that range and the population appears to be steady. No particular threats have been identified, so the International Union for Conservation of Nature has rated the bird as being of "least concern".

References

External links

rose-collared piha
Birds of the Tepuis
rose-collared piha
rose-collared piha
rose-collared piha
Taxonomy articles created by Polbot